Abubakar Tanko Ayuba (6 December 1945 – 25 May 2016) was a Nigerian politician who was elected senator for the Kebbi South constituency in Kebbi State, Nigeria in April 2007.

Background

Abubakar Ayuba was born on December 6, 1945.  He attended the Armed Forces Command and Staff College, Jaji in 1978, and the MNI National Institute for Policy & Strategic Studies, Kuru. In the army, he became a commander of the Corps of Signal, and a major general. Under military rule he was appointed Minister of Communications, military governor of Kaduna State, Chief of Administration and Chief of Policy and Plans.
He was appointed governor of Kaduna State in August 1990 during the military regime of General Ibrahim Babangida, handing over to the elected civilian governor Mohammed Dabo Lere in January 1992 at the start of the abortive Nigerian Third Republic.

Senate career

Ayuba was elected on the People's Democratic Party (PDP) platform in April 2007. He was appointed to committees on Science & Technology, Police Affairs, Navy, National Planning, Integration and Cooperation, Defence & Army and Communications. 
In January 2008, Leadership paper reported that Ayuba was one of the first senators to have his election nullified, but that he was appealing the decision.

In September 2008, he was awarded the prestigious 'Nelson Mandela Gold Award' for his excellent leadership and contributions to society.

References

Living people
1945 births
Governors of Kaduna State
Peoples Democratic Party members of the Senate (Nigeria)
People from Kebbi State
21st-century Nigerian politicians